Akhtachi-ye Mahali Rural District  is in Simmineh District of Bukan County, West Azerbaijan province, Iran. At the National Census of 2006, its population was 10,516 in 2,016 households. There were 10,146 inhabitants in 2,390 households at the following census of 2011. At the most recent census of 2016, the population of the rural district was 10,117 in 3,228 households. The largest of its 35 villages was Rahim Khan, with 1,820 people.

References 

Bukan County

Rural Districts of West Azerbaijan Province

Populated places in West Azerbaijan Province

Populated places in Bukan County